Two Hearts in 3/4 Time may refer to:

 a track on the 2000 album Since I Left You by the Avalanches
 a track on the 1958 album Happy-Go-Lucky Sound by The Three Suns
 Two Hearts in Waltz Time, the 1930 German film Zwei Herzen im 3/4 Takt